Dune Rats are an Australian rock band from Brisbane, Queensland. Originally, the band formed as a duo, with Danny Beus on guitar and lead vocals and BC Michael Marks on drums and backing vocals. The band later became a three-piece, with Brett Jansch (formerly a touring member of Bleeding Knees Club) joining as bassist. Brad Heald, originally from Red Riders and The Vines, also made touring appearances on bass from 2011 to 2012.

On 30 May 2014, the band released their self-titled debut album through their label Ratbag Records. They supported the release with a global and national tour. The following year they announced that they were officially launching Ratbag Records as a record label that would take on other performers.

On 11 February 2017, their second album The Kids Will Know It's Bullshit debuted at number one on the ARIA Albums Chart.

The group's fourth studio album, Real Rare Whale was announced on 11 February 2022 and was scheduled for release on 24 June 2022, before being delayed to July 29 due to vinyl manufacturing issues.

Discography

Studio albums

Extended plays

Singles

As featured artist

Music videos

Awards and nominations

ARIA Music Awards
The ARIA Music Awards are a set of annual ceremonies presented by Australian Recording Industry Association (ARIA), which recognise excellence, innovation, and achievement across all genres of the music of Australia. They commenced in 1987. 

! 
|-
| 2017 || The Kids Will Know It's Bullshit || ARIA Award for Best Rock Album ||  || 
|-
| 2022
| Real Rare Whale
| ARIA Award for Best Hard Rock or Heavy Metal Album
| 
| 
|-
|}

References

External links
 
 420 times that Dune Rats were the ultimate stoners at FasterLouder

Musical groups established in 2011
Australian pop punk groups
Musical groups from Brisbane
2011 establishments in Australia